Yours Sincerely, Jim Reeves is a studio album by Jim Reeves, released posthumously in 1966 on RCA Victor. It was produced by Chet Atkins and Bob Ferguson.

The recording on side one is from Reeves' radio interview that he gave while touring Europe in 1964. According to Greg Adams, who reviewed the disc for AllMusic, the side's track listing "gives the impression that the program is mostly music, but the songs typically appear in excerpts when referenced in Reeves' narration" of his life story. There's also "a snippet of a 1948 newscast Reeves made in his days as an announcer and two nearly complete songs performed during an early radio broadcast." The second side collects complete recordings of popular songs, but, once again, the songs are intermixed with introductions in between. According to the AllMusic reviewer, the short introductions could be taken "from a radio transcription or interview".

Track listing

Charts

References 

1966 albums
Jim Reeves albums
RCA Victor albums
Albums produced by Chet Atkins
Albums produced by Bob Ferguson (musician)